The 2017 Darul Quran Ittifaqiyah madrasa fire, which occurred at around 5:10 am on 14 September 2017, where a fire broke out at the Darul Quran Ittifaqiyah madrasa in Kampung Datuk Keramat, Kuala Lumpur resulted in 23 of the madrasa residents (comprising 21 students and two teachers) killed, while five others were reportedly injured.

Based on the investigations, there was a quarrel between the madrasa boarders and a group of seven teenage boys who entered the area to abuse the drugs they purchased, prompting them to burn the building. All of the seven troubled teens were expelled from school following numerous serious discipline offences. Further causes were including a firework assault against them by the same teens and a quarrel over who will use the futsal court between two parties.

Background 
The fire started on the second and upper floors of the madrasa building, and quickly spread throughout most of the building, preventing the only entrance which trapped the occupants from escaping. Many windows were also fitted with bolted grills that made it difficult for occupants to save themselves. Neighbouring witnesses reported that they were awakened at dawn by the cries of the students who were trapped inside the building and tried to save them but could not do so because the fire spread very quickly with many of them still trapped behind the metal window grills, adding that those who survived managed to escape by jumping directly to the ground while others through the building water pipelines. The fire was finally contained by the fire department at around 6:40 am.

Victims 
Twenty-three of the madrasa residents were killed in the incident, twenty-one were students and two were teachers. Their names and ages are as follows:

 Muhammad Danieal Md Amin, age 14
 Ahmad Rijal Mohammad Rodzi, 13
 Muhammad Hasrullah Ismaik, 14
 Muhammad Haikal Abdullah, 12
 Muhammad Aidil Aqmal Mohd Zamzuri, 10
 Muhammaf Fahmie Abdullah, 11
 Muhammad Afiq Haqimie Hairulizwan, 11
 Muhammad Aiman Ramzanudin, 12
 Azkar Dariemi F. Zaska, 8
 Nik Muhammad Ridzuan Bin Nik Azlan
 Azkar Abiedi F. Zaska, 11
 Umar Al Khatab Helmi, 6
 Amiel Asyraaf Abd Rasid, 11
 Muhammad Nizammudin Nasrun, 13
 Muhammad Hafiz Iskandar Sulaiman, 11
 Muhammad Harris Ikhwan Mohd Sulaiman, 10
 Muhammad Taufik Hidayat Norazizan, 16
 Ahmad Harith Adam Mohd Nor Hadi, 12
 Muhammad Hazim Ahmad Nor, 13
 Muhammad Syafik Haikal Abdullah, 13
 Muhammad Zattulah Roslan, 11
 Mohd Yusuf Md, 26 (teacher)
 Mohd Amrul Nizam Sakarno, 25 (teacher)

Investigations and arrests 
Investigations were then conducted by police and firefighters to find the cause of the fire. Initially, the firefighters thought it may be due to a short circuit but after a full investigation and through CCTVs outside the building, several suspects were identified to have infiltrated the area at around 3:10 am. Through other CCTVs footage retrieved from the five nearest petrol stations, the intruding suspects had earlier been seen buying petrol at one of the stations at 1:30 am in a Yamaha Lagenda motorcycle. Around seven suspects were identified by police to be involved and most of them were apprehended on 16 September and detained at Jinjang Police Station lock-up. Survivors were detained at the Ministry of Defence tent set outside the madrasa before being placed in secret premises around Keramat earlier on 15 September. The number of survivors was also kept confidential. Only the closest relatives were allowed to enter the premises to protect them from being approached by the public. Kuala Lumpur Police Chief Amar Singh concluded in a special press conference that the suspects were believed to have committed the crime out of revenge due to incidents of taunts among the students of the madrasa and the suspects. According to him, six out of seven suspects tested positive for drugs and two of them had previous criminal records relating to the offence of rioting and stealing vehicles. All suspects were aged between 11 and 18 years old.

Reactions 
The tragedy gained considerable attention among the government, the public as well as media abroad. Al Jazeera described the incident as "the most devastating fire in Malaysia since the beginning of the year".

Government 
The tragedy has been widely covered by leaders from both sides of the parties. Yang di-Pertuan Agong, Sultan Muhammad V and Prime Minister Najib Razak visited the scene. Najib has sent condolences to all victims involved and urged all madrasa to comply with safety standards and regulations to ensure similar incidents do not recur in the future. Deputy Prime Minister Ahmad Zahid Hamidi was the first to arrive at the scene in the afternoon after the incident. He mentioned the lack of control and training of madrasas that led to various incidents such as fires, tortures and the opening of illegal madrasas as well the appointment of teachers without any legal certification or qualification. Former Prime Minister Mahathir Mohamad expressed his disappointment as the incident seemed to indicate that no lesson was taken from a similar incident in 1989.

See also 
 1989 Taufiqiah Al-Khairiah madrasa fire

References 

2017 fires in Asia
2017 in Malaysia
2017 murders in Malaysia
Fires in Malaysia
Mass murder in 2017
Mass murder in Asia
September 2017 crimes in Asia
2010s in Kuala Lumpur
Fire disasters involving barricaded escape routes
September 2017 events in Malaysia
2017 disasters in Malaysia